Meeds Lake is a lake in Cook County, Minnesota, in the United States.

Meeds Lake was named for Alonzo Meeds, a state surveyor's assistant.

See also
List of lakes in Minnesota

References

Lakes of Minnesota
Lakes of Cook County, Minnesota